The 2011–12 women's national hockey team represented Canada in various tournaments during the 2011-12 hockey season. The head coach of the National team was York Lions women's ice hockey coach Dan Church.

News and notes
June 23, 2011: Sixteen of Hockey Canada's National Women's Program candidates will travel to Bratislava, Slovakia to participate in the 2011 IIHF High Performance Women's Camp from July 4–12. As part of the IIHF Ambassador and Mentor Program, Hockey Canada will send six coaching mentors (Melody Davidson, Doug Lidster, Rick Polutnik, Daniele Sauvageau, France St. Louis and Nancy Wilson) and four athlete ambassadors (Correne Bredin, Therese Brisson, Fiona Smith-Bell, and Gina Kingsbury).
Under 18 players

Senior players

July 21, 2011: Philanthropist Joan Snyder donated $2 million to Winsport Canada. The goal is to ensure priority rink access to female hockey players at all levels, and help expand the Canadian Women's Hockey League with the creation of Team Alberta. Part of the donation will cover the new addition to the Athletic and Ice Complex at Canada Olympic Park in Calgary. This will serve as the future home to Hockey Canada. In addition, there shall be four hockey rinks, one of which will be aptly called the Joan Snyder Rink.
On August 22, 2011, CBC television announced that Tessa Bonhomme will compete in their figure skating competition TV program Battle of the Blades. She is the first female hockey player to be a competitor in Battle of the Blades. Bonhomme is paired with David Pelletier, also an Olympic Gold Medalist, and they want to give the NHL players a run for their money.
September 22, 2011: Kim St. Pierre has decided to take the season off and have a baby. This has led to an opening for a third goaltender on the squad. Christina Kessler and Genevieve Lacasse are being considered as possible replacements.
October 2: Hockey Canada joined other hockey federations for the first-ever World Girls' Hockey Day. The initiative was spearheaded by the International Ice Hockey Federation as part of its initiatives to help grow the women's game.

National team
June 30, 2011: Team captain Hayley Wickenheiser was awarded the Order of Canada. Wickenheiser was in Ghana on behalf of Right to Play and was unable to accept the honour in person.
August 8, 2011: York Lions women's ice hockey head coach Dan Church has been named the head coach for the 2011 IIHF Eight Nations Tournament and the 2011 Four Nations Cup. Assisting him will be Doug Derragh from the Cornell Big Red women's ice hockey program and Danielle Goyette from the Calgary Dinos women's ice hockey program.
On August 23, 2011, Delaney Collins announced her retirement from international play.

2011 IIHF 12 Nations Tournament

Schedule
In the 14-1 win over Russia, several Canadian players accomplished numerous milestones. Meghan Mikkelson reached her 50th game played with the National team. Meghan Agosta reached the 100th point mark, while Jayna Hefford reached the 250th career point mark
August 31, 2011: Canada was bested by Sweden for just the second time in 66 all-time international meetings. Mallory Deluce opened the scoring 11 seconds into the game, while Meghan Agosta  scored a hat trick. Canada suffered from a 4-1 second-period deficit and lost by a 6-4 score.

Roster

2011 4 Nations Cup
October 3, 2011: Hockey Canada released the roster that will compete at the 2011 4 Nations Cup in Sweden. Cornell defender Laura Fortino, Wisconsin forward Stefanie McKeough, Dawson College forward Cassandra Poudrier, Cornell forward Lauriane Rougeau, and McGill forward Mélodie Daoust will make their debuts with the Canadian national women's ice hockey team at the event.
The November 10 match between Canada and the US marked the 100th time since 1990 that the two countries have played each other.

Schedule

Roster

IIHF Worlds
In preparation for the 2012 IIHF Women's World Championship, the National Team held a training camp at Carleton University in Ottawa from March 27 to 30.

Exhibition

Tournament
In the opening match of the tournament, the US team scored five goals in the first five minutes and 32 seconds. In 102 prior contests, the Canadian team had never allowed more than seven goals. That was in a 7-3 loss on January 6, 2002 in Detroit. Jocelyne Lamoureux scored three goals while assisting on three others. Her sister, Monique Lamoureux-Kolls and Hilary Knight each scored twice. Haley Irwin left the game during the first period as she fell into the boards behind the American net

In a game versus Russia at the 2012 IIHF Women's World Championship, Wickenheiser accumulated six points (two goals, four assists) in a 14-1 victory.

Under 18 team

Training camp
May 19, 2011: Hockey Canada announced 49 players will attend the National Under 18 conditioning camp from May 25 to 29, 2011 at McMaster University in Hamilton, Ontario.
The Under 18 team held another strength and conditioning camp in August 2011 at the Canadian International Hockey Academy in Rockland, Ontario. The invitees were separated into two teams: Team Red and Team White.
Intrasquad games

Exhibition
From August 18 to 21, the Under 18 team will compete versus the United States in a three game series at the Canadian International Hockey Academy in Rockland, Ontario.

Roster

Player stats

National Under 18 championships

IIHF Worlds
Canada was in Pool B at the 2012 IIHF World Women's U18 Championship. Alexis Crossley scored the game-winning goal for Team Canada in the gold medal game at the 2012 IIHF World Women's U18 Championship, a 3-0 triumph over the United States. Emerance Maschmeyer earned the shutout for Team Canada.

Roster

Under 22 team

Training camp
The Under 22 team held their training camp in August 2011 at the Canadian International Hockey Academy in Rockland, Ontario. The invitees were separated into two teams: Team Blue and Team Yellow. The August 13 match resulted in 14 skaters participating in the shootout. Dartmouth Big Green women's ice hockey skater Sasha Nanji scored the game-winning goal in the shootout. In the third contest, Isabel Menard passed to Laura Fortino as she scored the game-winning goal for Team Blue at 30 seconds of the first overtime. With the win, Team Blue won the series by a 2-1 margin.
Intrasquad games

Rosters

Team Blue

Team Yellow

Meco Cup
November 8: Hockey Canada announced its roster for the 2012 Meco Cup.

Roster

The following players were invited but unable to attend:
Emmanuelle Blais, Montreal Stars
Mélodie Daoust,	McGill University
Jenelle Kohanchuk, Boston University
Marie-Philip Poulin, Boston University
Carolyne Prevost, University of Wisconsin
Jessica Wong, University of Minnesota Duluth

Exhibition

Scoring leaders

Schedule

Awards and honours
Erin Ambrose, Directorate Award, Best Defender, 2012 IIHF World Women's U18 Championship.

See also
 2010–11 Canada women's national ice hockey team
 2012–13 Canada women's national ice hockey team
 Canada women's national ice hockey team

References

 
Canada women's national ice hockey team seasons